Harry Maguire (6 July 1928 – 18 August 2007) was an Irish sailor who competed in the 1964 Summer Olympics.

References

External links

Olympic sailors of Ireland
Irish male sailors (sport)
Sailors at the 1964 Summer Olympics – Dragon
1928 births
2007 deaths